Helmi is a given name.
It is an Estonian and Finnish feminine given name  literally meaning pearl or bead. The name is derived from the Proto-Baltic-Finnic *helmes, or 'amber'. In Finland, Helmi is also used as a short form of the name Vilhelmiina or Vilhelmina. Helmi has been among the most popular names for baby girls born in Finland in recent years.

It is also used as a masculine name with differing origins in Indonesia and Malaysia.

Estonian/Finnish
Helmi Juvonen (1903–1985), American artist active in Seattle, Washington
Helmi Krohn (1871–1967), Finnish writer
Helmi Mäelo (1898–1978), Estonian writer and social activist
Helmi Puur (1936–2014), Estonian ballerina

Other
Eddy Helmi Abdul Manan (born 1979), Malaysian footballer
Helmi Johannes (born 1961), Indonesian television newscaster and executive producer
Khairul Helmi Johari (born 1988), Malaysian footballer
Mohd Helmi Eliza Elias (born 1983), Malaysian footballer

See also

Helmy
Hilmi

References

Masculine given names
Feminine given names
Finnish feminine given names
Estonian feminine given names